Jad (Java Decompiler) is, an unmaintained decompiler for the Java programming language.
Jad provides a command-line user interface to extract source code from class files.

See also
Java Decompiler
Mocha

References

External links 
 
 JAD Softpedia Mirror

Java decompilers
Disassemblers
Software obfuscation